Manch is a political term and may refer to:

India
Manch Theatre
Marwari Yuva Manch
Marxist Manch
Utkal Prantiya Marwari Yuva Manch
Goa Suraksha Manch
Ekta Manch
Tripura Ganatantrik Manch
Kabir Kala Manch
Jan Sangharsh Manch
Muslim Rashtriya Manch
Rashtriya Jagran Manch
Jana Natya Manch
Chetna Natya Manch
Bahujan Republican Ekta Manch
Paschimbanga Ganatantrik Manch
Sikkim Ekta Manch
Rashtriya Swabhiman Manch
Dr. Syamaprasad Jana Jagaran Manch
All India Dalit Mahila Adhikar Manch

Nepal
Nepal Dalit Utthan Manch